Bicol University (Bikol: Unibersidad nin Bikol, Tagalog: Pamantasan ng Bikol), also referred to by its acronym (BU or Bicol U), is a regional state, research and coeducational higher education institution in Legazpi City, Albay, Philippines with external campuses scattered throughout the provinces of Albay and Sorsogon. BU is an ISO 9001:2008 certified public university.

The university is partly subsidized by the Philippine government. Students of the university and its graduates are referred to as “Mga Iskolar ng Bayan” (“Scholars of the Nation”) but they are commonly called as Bueños. Students who wish to study in the university must pass the Bicol University College Entrance Test (BUCET).During the COVID-19 pandemic, the university implemented the Bicol University College Entrance Scoring System (BUCESS) for its admission of undergraduate students for academic years 2021-2022 and 2022-2023.

History 
The Bicol University was founded on June 21, 1969, by virtue of Republic Act 5521 and was formally organized on September 22, 1970.  It evolved out of six educational institutions integrated to form the first state university in the Bicol Region (Region V): 
 Bicol Teachers College (BTC) with its Laboratory School in Daraga, Albay, now the BU College of Education (BUCE) with its Integrated Laboratory School (ILS)
 Daraga East Central School (DECS) also in Daraga, Albay, initially renamed as Bicol University Pilot Elementary School (BUPES), now integrated with the BUCE-ILS as its Elementary Department
 Albay High School in Legazpi City, now the BUCE-ILS High School Department
 Bicol Regional School for Arts and Trades (BRSAT) in Legazpi City, converted from the Albay Trade School by virtue of Republic Act 1129 on June 16, 1954, now the College of Industrial Technology and the College of Engineering.
 Roxas Memorial Agricultural School (RMAS) in Guinobatan, Albay, which became the College of Agriculture, now renamed as the College of Agriculture and Forestry.
 School of Fisheries in Tabaco, Albay, turned into the College of Fisheries, now the Bicol University Tabaco Campus.

These public schools and colleges, now part of Bicol University, had served the people of the region for more than half a century prior to their forming Bicol University.

Organization and administration
The governance of the university is vested in the Board of Regents, abbreviated as BOR. The board, with its 12 members, is the highest decision-making body of the university.

The chairperson or its designated commissioner of the Commission on Higher Education (CHED) serves as the board's chairperson while the president of the Bicol University is the vice-chairperson. The chairpersons of the Committees of Higher Education of the Senate and the House of Representatives are also members of the Board of Regents which are concurrent with their functions as committee chairpersons.

The students of the Bicol University are represented by a student regent, who is also the chairperson of the University Student Council. While the faculty regent is likewise nominated by the faculty members of the whole university. Alumni are represented by the president of the BU Alumni Association.

As of 2023, the members of the Board of Regents of the Bicol University are:

The 9th Bicol University President issued the Bicol University Vision and Quality Policy:

Vision -  A university for humanity characterized by productive scholarship, transformative leadership, collaborative service, and distinctive character for sustainable societies.

Quality Policy -  Bicol University commits to continually strive for excellence in instruction, research, and extension by meeting the highest level of clientele satisfaction and adhering to quality standards and applicable statutory and regulatory requirements.

Campus

Legazpi West (Main) Campus 
The Legazpi West (Main) Campus is located on the boundary of Daraga, Albay and Legazpi City along the national highway, Rizal St. Aside from the Administration Building, the campus also hosts the following colleges and institutes:

 College of Education (BUCE);
 College of Nursing (BUCN);
 College of Arts and Letters (BUCAL);
 College of Science (BUCS);
 Graduate School (BUGS);
 Institute of Physical Education, Sports and Recreation (BUIPESR);
 College of Medicine (BUCM);
 College of Law (BUCL);
 Jesse M. Robredo Institute of Governance and Development (BUJMRIGD); and
 Open University (BUOU).

It also hosts the Bicol University College of Education Integrated Laboratory School-Elementary Department and Bicol University College of Education Integrated Laboratory School-High School Department (BUCEILS-HS). The Bicol University Main Library, Student Union Center, Amphitheatre and the Little Theater are also found in this campus.

The proposed College of Dental Medicine is suggested to be hosted in this campus.

Legazpi East Campus 

Located in Enlisted Men's Barrio (EM Barrio), Barangay 1 also in Legazpi City, the campus hosts the College of Engineering (BUCENG), College of Industrial Technology (BUCIT) and the Institute of Design and Architecture (BUIDeA).

Daraga Campus 
Located in Sagpon, Daraga, Albay, and is less than a kilometer from the main campus, the campus consists of the College of Social Sciences and Philosophy (BUCSSP) and College of Business, Economics and Management (BUCBEM). This campus was formerly called College of Arts and Science (BUCAS).

The BUCSSP offers the following programs:

 BS Psychology
 BS Social Work
 AB Philosophy
 AB Political Science
 AB Peace Studies
 AB Sociology

The BUCBEM offers the following programs:

 BS Accountancy
 BS Economics
 BS Entrepreneurship
 BS Management
 BS in Business Administration Major in Financial Management
 BS in Business Administration Major in Human Resource Management
 BS in Business Administration Major in Marketing Management
 BS in Business Administration Major in Operations Management
 BS in Business Administration Major in Microfinance

Tabaco Campus 
Located in Tayhi, Tabaco, Albay. Courses offered in this campus  are Bachelor of Science in Nursing, Food Technology, Social Work, Fisheries and Aquaculture, Marine Fisheries, Fish Technology, Coastal Resource Management, Secondary Education, and Entrepreneurship.

Guinobatan Campus 
Located in Pan-Philippine Highway in the town of Guinobatan, Albay, formerly known as Guinobatan Rural High School in 1927; Roxas Memorial Agricultural School in 1950; Bicol University College of Agriculture (BUCA) in 1969 through RA 5521; with the offering of Bachelor of Science in Forestry starting in 1991, is now known as Bicol University College of Agriculture and Forestry (BUCAF). BUCAF is a member of Philippine Agroforestry Education and Research Network (PAFERN)

Polangui Campus 
Located in Centro Occidental, Polangui, Albay, this was formerly known as the School for Philippine Craftsmen and offered vocational courses. It was integrated into Bicol University, through R.A. 7722, R.A. 8292 & R.A. 8769, on December 14, 2000, and renamed as Bicol University Polangui Campus. From the five courses offered in 2000, it now offers fifteen courses including BSc in Nursing, BSc in Computer Engineering and BSc in Electronics and Communications Engineering.

Gubat Campus 
Located in Gubat, Sorsogon, this campus offers bachelor's degrees in Agricultural Technology, Secondary and Elementary Education, Fisheries, Food Technology, Entrepreneurship, Peace and Security Studies and Computer Science are offered in this campus. This is the only BU campus outside the province of Albay.

Facilities and services

Library System 
The University Library System is for the use of students and other researchers. It has a collection of books in different fields of knowledge and all the published undergraduate and graduate research. It is composed of ten sub-libraries, namely:
 The University Library
 College of Education Library
 College of Nursing Library
 College of Agriculture and Forestry Library
 ILS-Elementary Library
 ILS-High School Library
 East Campus Library
 Polangui Campus Library
 Tabaco Campus Library
 Gubat Campus Library

Athletics 
It organizes and facilitates the conduct of intercollegiate sports and University's participation in sports events. It runs wellness and fitness programs. Some of its facilities for Athletics include a soccer field, olympic-sized swimming pool, a rubberized track oval, and a grandstand.

Radio station 
The university has its own radio station, BUFM 106.3.

Notable alumni 

 Venus Raj (BUCAL; ComArts, Major in Journalism) was Miss Philippines Earth 2008 (Miss Philippines Eco Tourism 2008), Binibining Pilipinas 2010 (Binibining Pilipinas Universe 2010), Miss Universe 2010 (4th Runner-Up)

References

External links
 Bicol University High School Batch 2007 official website 

Universities and colleges in Bicol Region
Universities and colleges in Albay
Education in Legazpi, Albay
Educational institutions established in 1969
State universities and colleges in the Philippines
1969 establishments in the Philippines